In Greek mythology, Porthaon (Ancient Greek: Πορθάων, genitive Πορθάονος), sometimes referred to as Parthaon or Portheus (seems related to the verb portheō and perthō, "destroy'), was a king of Calydon and son of Agenor or Ares by Epicaste and thus brother of Demonice (also known as Demodice) and possibly Thestius.

Family 
Porthaon was the husband of Euryte, daughter of Hippodamas, who became the mother of his children, Oeneus, Agrius, Alcathous, Melas, Leucopeus and Sterope. In some account, his wife Laothoe bore him three daughters, Sterope, Eurythemiste and Stratonice. By an unnamed servant, Porthaon was the father of the Argonaut Laocoön. Dia, the consort of his son Agrius was also called his daughter.

Genealogical tree

Notes

References 

 Antoninus Liberalis, The Metamorphoses of Antoninus Liberalis translated by Francis Celoria (Routledge 1992). Online version at the Topos Text Project.
 Apollodorus, The Library with an English Translation by Sir James George Frazer, F.B.A., F.R.S. in 2 Volumes, Cambridge, MA, Harvard University Press; London, William Heinemann Ltd. 1921. ISBN 0-674-99135-4. Online version at the Perseus Digital Library. Greek text available from the same website.
Apollonius Rhodius, Argonautica translated by Robert Cooper Seaton (1853-1915), R. C. Loeb Classical Library Volume 001. London, William Heinemann Ltd, 1912. Online version at the Topos Text Project.
 Apollonius Rhodius, Argonautica. George W. Mooney. London. Longmans, Green. 1912. Greek text available at the Perseus Digital Library.
 Pausanias, Description of Greece with an English Translation by W.H.S. Jones, Litt.D., and H.A. Ormerod, M.A., in 4 Volumes. Cambridge, MA, Harvard University Press; London, William Heinemann Ltd. 1918. . Online version at the Perseus Digital Library
Pausanias, Graeciae Descriptio. 3 vols. Leipzig, Teubner. 1903.  Greek text available at the Perseus Digital Library.

Children of Ares
Demigods in classical mythology
Family of Calyce
Princes in Greek mythology
Kings in Greek mythology
Aetolian characters in Greek mythology